Pungsan or Poongsan can refer to:

Places
Kimhyonggwon County, a county in Ryanggang Province, North Korea formerly known as "Pungsan"
Pungsan-eup, a town in Andong, North Gyeongsang Province, South Korea

Other
Pungsan Sim clan in Korea
Pungsan dog, a breed of hunting dog from North Korea
Poongsan, a 2011 South Korean film
Poongsan Corporation, a South Korean company